is a Japanese actor. He has appeared in more than 90 films since 1989.

Selected filmography

Film

Television

References

External links
 Agency profile 
 

1950 births
Living people
People from Tokoname
Japanese male film actors
Japanese male television actors